Mchenga is a small genus of haplochromine cichlids endemic to Lake Malawi in East Africa. They are part of a group known as utaka.

Species
There are currently six recognized species in this genus:
 Mchenga conophoros (Stauffer, LoVullo & McKaye, 1993)
 Mchenga cyclicos (Stauffer, LoVullo & McKaye, 1993)
 Mchenga eucinostomus (Regan, 1922)
 Mchenga flavimanus (Iles, 1960)
 Mchenga inornata (Boulenger, 1908)
 Mchenga thinos (Stauffer, LoVullo & McKaye, 1993)

References

 
Haplochromini

Cichlid genera
Taxa named by Jay Richard Stauffer Jr.
Taxa named by Ad Konings